Victor Ricciardi is an American professor of business and author. He was an assistant professor of financial management at Goucher College.

Life 
Victor Ricciardi completed a Bachelor of Business Administration in accounting and management from Hofstra University in 1991. He earned a Master of Business Administration in finance in 1995 from St. John's University. Ricciardi obtained an Advanced Professional Certificate in economics at St. John's University in 1996. He was a doctoral candidate in finance at Golden Gate University. Ricciardi's dissertation research was on decision-making process by finance professors and financial planners in assessing risk with stock investments.

Ricciardi worked as an investment fund accountant for Dreyfus Corporation and the Alliance Capital Management. From 2005 to 2008, he was an assistant professor of finance at Kentucky State University. Ricciardi was the editor of electronic journals distributed by the Social Science Research Network. He is an assistant professor of financial management at Goucher College from 2010 to 2019.

Selected works

References

External links
 

Hofstra University alumni
St. John's University (New York City) alumni
Living people
Year of birth missing (living people)
Kentucky State University faculty
Goucher College faculty and staff
20th-century American male writers
21st-century American male writers
20th-century American non-fiction writers
21st-century American non-fiction writers